Yi Hwang (January 3, 1502– January 3, 1571) was the most important Korean philosopher, writer, and Confucian scholar of the Joseon Dynasty. He was a figure of the Neo-Confucian literati, established the Yeongnam School and set up the Dosan Seowon, a private Confucian academy.

Yi Hwang is often referred to by his pen name Toegye ("Retreating Creek"). His courtesy name was Gyeongho.

He is considered the most important philosopher of Korea - he is honored by printing his portrait on the (most often used) 1000 Won banknote, on the reverse of which one can see an image of his school, Dosan Seaowon. His interpretation of Neo-Confucianism was influential not only in Korea, but also in Japan, Taiwan, and Vietnam, and is now being studied even in the mainland China. His main work, Ten Diagrams on Sage Learning, originally published in classical Chinese language, has been already translated into modern Korean, Japanese, Vietnamese, English, French, German, Russian and Polish.

Some of his writings were looted by the Japanese military during the Japanese invasion of Korea.

Life 
Yi Hwang was born in Ongye-ri, Andong, North Gyeongsang Province, in 1501. He belonged to the Jinbo Yi clan, and was the youngest son among eight children. A child prodigy, he learned the Analects of Confucius from his uncle at age twelve and admiring the poetry of Tao Yuanming, started writing poetry. His poem Yadang (hangul: 야당, hanja: 野塘, "Pond in the Wild"), written at the age of eighteen, is considered one of his major works. Around the age of twenty, he immersed himself in the study of I Ching and Neo-Confucianism.

He came to Seoul (then known as Hanseong) when he was 23 years old and entered the national academy Sungkyunkwan in 1523. In 1527 he passed preliminary exams to become a government official, but re-entered Sungkyunkwan at the age of 33 and socialized with the scholar Kim In-hu. He passed the civil service exams with top honors in 1534 and continued his scholarly pursuits whilst working for the government. He returned to his childhood home at the death of his mother at the age of 37 and mourned her for 3 years. He was appointed various positions from the age of 39 and sometimes held multiple positions including secret royal inspector, or Amhaengeosa (hangul: 암행어사, hanja: 暗行御史), in 1542. His integrity made him relentless as he took part in purges of corrupt government officials. On numerous occasions he was even exiled from the capital for his firm commitment to principle.

Yi Hwang was disillusioned by the power struggles and discord in the royal court during the later years of King Jungjong's reign and left political office. However, he was continuously brought out of retirement and held several positions away from the royal court and in rural areas. He was the governor of Danyang at 48 and governor of Punggi afterwards. During his days at Pungi he redeveloped and improved the private Neo-Confucian academy Baekundong Seowon established by his predecessor Ju Se-bung.

He was named Daesaseong (대사성, head instructor) of Sungkyunkwan in 1552 but turned down other prominent offices later on. In 1560, he established the Dosan seodang and engrossed himself in meditation, study, and teaching his disciples. King Myeongjong tried to coax him back to political office, but he was steadfast in his devotion to study. He finally returned to the royal court at 67 upon the king's request when envoys from the Ming Dynasty came to Seoul. When King Myeongjong suddenly died, his successor King Seonjo appointed Yi Hwang as Yejo panseo (hangul: 예조판서, hanja: 禮曹判書, minister of rites) but he declined and returned to his home once again.

However, the king continuously called Yi Hwang back and unable to refuse further, he resumed office at the age of 68 and wrote many advisory documents including Seonghak sipdo (hangul: 성학십도, hanja: 聖學十圖, "Ten Diagrams on Sage Learning"). He also gave lectures from the teachings of Song Dynasty Confucian scholars Cheng Yi and Cheng Hao, I Ching, Analects, and Zhang Zai in royal presence. He finally retired from politics at the age of 70 and died in 1570.

During forty years of public life he served four kings (Jungjong, Injong, Myeongjong and Seonjo). On his death, Yi Hwang was posthumously promoted to the highest ministerial rank, and his mortuary tablet housed in a Confucian shrine as well as in the shrine of King Seonjo. His disciples and followers reorganized the Dosan seodang to Dosan Seowon in 1574.

Teachings
Yi Hwang was the author of many books on Confucianism. He followed the dualistic Neo-Confucianism teachings of Chu Hsi, which views i (Chinese "li") and gi (Chinese "qi") as the forces of foundation of the universe. Yi Hwang placed emphasis on the i, the formative element, as the existential force that determines gi. This school of thought contrasted with the school that focused on the concrete element of gi, established by Yi Hwang's counterpart Yi I. Understanding the determinative pattern of i would be more essential in understanding the universe than recognizing the principles that govern individual manifestations of gi. This approach of placing importance on the role of i became the core of the Yeongnam School, where Yi Hwang's legacy was carried on by prominent figures such as Yu Seong-ryong and Kim Seong-il.

Yi Hwang was also talented in calligraphy and poetry, writing a collection of sijo, a three line poetic form popular with the literati of the Joseon period.

Selected works

These are some of Yi Hwang's published writings:
 1599 — 退溪全書
 1681 — The Ten Diagrams on Sage Learning (hangul: 성학십도, hanja: 聖學十圖)
 1746 — 退溪集
 Outline and Explanations of the Works of Zhu Xi (hangul: 주자서절요, hanja: 朱子書節要)
 Commentary on the Heart Sutra (hangul: 심경석의, hanja: 心經釋義)
 History of Neo-Confucianism in the Song, Yuan and Ming Dynasties (hangul:송계원명이학통록, hanja:宋季元明理學通錄)
 The Four-Seven Debate (hangul: 사칠속편, hanja: 四七續篇): discusses Mencius's philosophy with Gi Dae-seung

Ten Diagrams on Sage Learning
The Neo-Confucian literature of Seonghaksipdo was composed by Yi Hwang in 1568 for King Seonjo. It is a series of lectures for rulers through examples of past sages. Traditional Confucians had affirmed that any man could learn to become a sage; the new Confucians made the ideal of sagehood real and attainable, just as enlightenment was for Buddhists. Yi Hwang intended to present that path by starting each chapter with a diagram and related text drawn from Zhu Xi or another leading authority, and concluding with a brief commentary. He intended for “Ten Diagrams” to be made into a ten paneled standing screen, as well as a short book, so that the mind of the viewer could be constantly engaged with its contents, until it totally assimilated the material.

Family
Father: Yi Sik (12 September 1463 - 13 June 1502) (이식)
Mother:
Biological: Lady Park of the Chuncheon Park clan (? - 1537) (춘천 박씨) – Yi Sik's 2nd wife.
Adoptive: Lady Kim of the Munso Kim clan (문소 김씨) – Yi Sik's 1st wife.
Wives and their issue(s):
Lady Heo of the Gimhae Heo clan (1502 - 1528) (김해 허씨)
Yi Jun (1523 - 1583) (이준) – 1st son.
Yi Chae (1527 - 1550) (이채) – 2nd son.
Lady Gwon of the Andong Gwon clan (1502 - 1547) (안동 권씨) – No issue.
Unnamed concubine
Yi Jeok (이적) – 3rd son.
Gisaeng Du-Hyang (기생 두향) – No issue.

Legacy

Toegyero, a street in central Seoul, is named after him, and he is depicted on the South Korean 1,000 won note. The Taekwondo pattern Toi-Gye was named in honor of Yi Hwang.

Many institutes and university research departments devoted to Yi Hwang have been established. The Toegye Studies Institute set up in Seoul in 1970, Kyungpook National University's Toegye Institute opened in 1979, and an institute and library in Dankook University in 1986. There are research institutes in Tokyo, Taiwan, Hamburg and the United States.

A notable direct descendant of Yi is poet and independence activist Yi Yuksa, who is also an Andong native.

See also
 List of Korean philosophers
 Yi I
 Neo-Confucianism

Notes

References
 Min-Hong Choi, A Modern History of Korean Philosophy, Seong Moon SA, Seoul, 1980, p. 67-81.
 Il-ch'ol Sin et al., Main Currents of Korean Thought, The Korean National Commission for UNESCO - Si-sa-yong-o-sa Publishers Inc. - Pace International Research Inc., Seoul - Arch Cape, Oregon, 1983, p. 82-93,  .
 Wm. Theodore de Bary, JaHyun Kim Haboush (eds.), The Rise of Neo Confucianism in Korea, Columbia University Press, New York, 1985, p. 223-302, .
 Michael C. Kalton, Ten Diagrams on Sage Learning, Columbia University Press, New York, 1988.
 André Jacob, Jean-Fançois Mattéi (dir.), Encyclopédie philosophique universelle. III. Les Oeuvres philosphiques, Presses Universitaires de France, Paris 1992, Tome 2,  p. 4122-4123, .
 Michael C. Kalton, The Four-Seven Debate. An Annotated Translation of the Most Famous Controversy in Korean Neo-Confucian Thought, SUNY Press, Albany, 1994.
 Ian P. McGreal (ed.), Great Thinkers of the Eastern World: The Major Thinkers and the Philosophical and Religious Classics of China, India, Japan, Korea, and the World of Islam, HarperCollins Publishers, New York, 1995, p. 413-417, .
 Peter H. Lee, Wm. Theodore de Bary, Yong-ho Ch'oe, Hugh H. W. Kang (eds.), Sources of Korean Tradition, Columbia University Press, New York 1997, vol. I, p. 286-290, 349-375, .
 Oliver Leaman (ed.), Encyclopedia of Asian Philosophy, Routledge, London - New Yourk, 2001, 579-580.
 Seung-hwan Lee et al., Korean Philosophy: Its Tradition and Modern Transformation, The Korean National Commission for UNESCO - Hollym Intl., Seoul - Elisabeth, NJ, 2004, p. 75-94,  (Volume VI).
 Xinzhong Yao (ed.), RoutledgeCurzon Encyclopedia of Confucianism, RoutledgeCurzon, London - New York, 2003, vol. 2: O-Z, p. 753-754, ; 0-415-30653-1.
 Yi Hwang, Étude de la sagesse en dix diagrammes, éd. Hye-young Tcho & Jean Golfin, Éditions du Cerf, Paris, 2005, .
 Youngsun Back & Philip J. Ivanhoe (eds.), Traditional Korena Philosophy: Problems and Debates, Rownan & Littlefield Intl., London - New York 2017, p. 25-68, .

External links 

To become a sage, translation of Ten Diagrams on Sage Learning, Michael C. Kalton, Columbia University Press, 1988.
Cyber Dosan Seowon, general information on Yi Hwang and his teachings
The T'oegye Studies Institute, Busan
The T'oegye Research Institute, Kyungpook National University
Detailed bibliography
Dosan school 
Toigye Academic researchers 
Toigye Academic Business Association 

1501 births
1570 deaths
16th-century Korean poets
Korean Confucianists
16th-century Korean philosophers
People from Andong